Sayt'uqucha or Sayt'u Qucha (Quechua suyt'u, sayt'u rectangular, qucha lake, lagoon, "rectangular lake", hispanicized spellings Saytococha) is a lake in Peru. It is situated in the Puno Region, Sandia Province, Cuyocuyo District.

References

Lakes of Puno Region
Lakes of Peru